Oleg Starynskyi (born 28 November 1985) is a Ukrainian professional football manager who is currently the head coach of Cambodian Premier League side Phnom Penh Crown.

Career
Prior to re-joining Phnom Penh Crown, Starynskyi was head of the Analysis Department at FC Shakhtar Donetsk's academy in Ukraine. Starynskyi also worked with the Phnom Penh Crown U-19 in 2016 and was an assistant coach of the Cambodia national under-19 football team that same year. He also had stints coaching teams in Moldova and Malaysia.

References

External links

1985 births
Living people
Ukrainian football managers
Phnom Penh Crown FC managers
Ukrainian expatriate football managers
Expatriate football managers in Cambodia
Expatriate football managers in Malaysia
Expatriate football managers in Moldova